There are 30 stadiums in use by Double-A Minor League Baseball teams. The Eastern League uses 12 stadiums, the Southern League uses 8, and Texas League uses 10. The oldest stadium is FirstEnergy Stadium (1951) in Reading, Pennsylvania, home of the Eastern League's Reading Fightin Phils. The newest stadiums are Toyota Field in Madison, Alabama, home of the Southern League's Rocket City Trash Pandas, and Riverfront Stadium in Wichita, Kansas, home of the Texas League's Wichita Wind Surge. Both of those stadiums opened in 2020, though no games were hosted that year due to the COVID-19 pandemic. One stadium was built in the 1950s, two in the 1980s, eight in the 1990s, eleven in the 2000s, six in the 2010s, and two in the 2020s. The highest seating capacity is 10,486 at Hammons Field in Springfield, Missouri, where the Texas League's Springfield Cardinals play. The lowest capacity is 5,038 at Admiral Fetterman Field in Pensacola, Florida, where the Southern League's Pensacola Blue Wahoos play.

Stadiums

Eastern League

Southern League

Texas League

Map

Gallery

Eastern League

Southern League

Texas League

See also

List of Major League Baseball stadiums
List of Triple-A baseball stadiums
List of High-A baseball stadiums
List of Single-A baseball stadiums

References

General reference

Minor league baseball venues
Double-A
Double-A baseball stadiums